Graphium dorcus, or Tabitha's swordtail, is a butterfly found in Sulawesi, Indonesia, that belongs to the swallowtail family. The species was first described by Wilhem de Haan in 1840.

Subspecies

G. d. dorcus (northern Sulawesi)
G. d. butungensis Hanafusa, 1997 (Buton)

Etymology
It is named for the biblical Dorcas, who in Aramaic and other languages is called Tabitha.

References

External links 

 Sulawesi Checklist
 "Graphium dorcus de Haan, 1840". Insecta.pro. With images.

Butterflies described in 1840
dorcus